Referendum G was a 2006 Colorado ballot measure. It removed provisions, dates, and references to obsolete laws from three sections of the state Constitution. The laws removed regarded militia duty dating back to the post-Civil War era, the consolidation of the Denver Public School District which has already occurred, and references to gender and past dates in the Old-Age Pension Fund.

External links
 Legislative Council ballot analysis
 Ballot question language
 Bell Policy Center 2006 Voter's Guide analysis

2006 Colorado ballot measures